Gausel Church is a parish church of the Church of Norway in the southern part of the large Stavanger Municipality in Rogaland county, Norway. It is located in the Gausel neighborhood in the borough of Hinna in the southern part of the city of Stavanger. It is the church for the Gausel parish which is part of the Ytre Stavanger prosti (deanery) in the Diocese of Stavanger. The red brick church was built in a fan-shaped design in 1996 using designs by city architect. The church seats about 450 people.

See also
List of churches in Rogaland

References

Churches in Stavanger
Brick churches in Norway
20th-century Church of Norway church buildings
Churches completed in 1996
1996 establishments in Norway